Berk may refer to:

 Berk (name), a surname, given name, or any of several people with that name
 Berk, Bolu, Turkey, a village
 Berk Trade and Business School, New York City
 Berk, a fictional island in the How to Train Your Dragon series of books and films
 , a torpedo cruiser of the Ottoman Navy later renamed Berk
 Berk, rhyming slang often used to mean "foolish person"
 Berk., taxonomic author abbreviation of Miles Joseph Berkeley (1803–1889), English cryptogamist and founder of the science of plant pathology

See also 

 
 Berk–Tabatznik syndrome, a medical condition
 De Berk (disambiguation)
 Berks (disambiguation)
 Birk (disambiguation)
 Berkshire (disambiguation)